Armenia declared its independence from the Soviet Union on August 23, 1990, having previously been the Armenian Soviet Socialist Republic, one of the constituent republics of the USSR since 1936, and part of the Transcaucasian Soviet Federated Socialist Republic since 1920. In the wake of the August 1991 Coup, a referendum was held on the question of secession. Following an overwhelming vote in favor, full independence was declared on September 21, 1991. However, widespread recognition did not occur until the formal dissolution of the Soviet Union on December 25, 1991. The United States recognized Armenia on December 25, 1991.

The embassy in Yerevan was opened February 3, 1992, with Steven Mann as Chargé d'affaires ad interim.

Ambassadors

The U.S. Ambassador to Armenia holds the title Ambassador Extraordinary and Plenipotentiary.

See also

Ambassadors from the United States
Ambassadors of Armenia to the United States
Armenia – United States relations
Embassy of Armenia, Washington, D.C.
Embassy of the United States, Yerevan
Foreign relations of Armenia
Foreign relations of the United States

References

External links
 
 United States Department of State: Background notes on Armenia
 United States Department of State: Chiefs of Mission for Armenia
 United States Department of State: Armenia
 United States Embassy in Yerevan

Armenia
Main
United States